Shri Swaminarayan Mandir, Downey is a Swaminarayan Hindu temple in Downey. It comes under the Laxmi Narayan Dev Gadi of the Swaminarayan Sampradaya. 

In 2009, the temple celebrated its 9th anniversary with a Ram Katha, Maha Vishnu Yagna and Maruti Yagna in the presence of Rakeshprasad.

See also
 List of Swaminarayan temples

References

Swaminarayan temples
Hindu temples in California
Downey, California
Religious buildings and structures in Los Angeles County, California
Buildings and structures in Los Angeles County, California
2000 establishments in California
Indian-American culture in California